Phragmataecia sericeata is a species of moth of the family Cossidae. It is found in Ghana and  Nigeria.

References

Moths described in 1910
Phragmataecia
Insects of West Africa
Moths of Africa